Mountain Air was an airline based in Nepal. Its aircraft were re-possessed in 2002.

History 
Mountain Air was established in April 2000. In November 2002 the Raytheon took back possession of two aircraft from Mountain Air because the airline defaulted on the aircraft-leasing arrangements.

Destinations 
Gorkha Airlines regularly served the following destinations, which were cancelled either at the closure of operations or before:

Mountain Air also operated scheduled mountain sightseeing flights from Kathmandu to Mount Everest range. The flights usually departed in the early morning hours and return to the airport one hour later.

Fleet 
At the time of closure, Mountain Air operated the following aircraft:

References 

Airlines established in 2000
Airlines disestablished in 2002
Defunct airlines of Nepal
2000 establishments in Nepal
2002 disestablishments in Nepal